Dioryctria rossi is a species of snout moth in the genus Dioryctria. This moth was discovered and named by Douglas Alexander Ross, chief entomologist at the Vernon forest entomology laboratory and research centre in Vernon, British Columbia, from 1950 to 1970. It was described by Eugene G. Munroe in 1959. It is found in western North America, from southern British Columbia to northern Mexico and east to New Mexico.

The wingspan is 22–34 mm. The forewings are orange brown, without an inner transverse line and with whitish markings, primarily consisting of a longitudinal streak. The hindwings are pale.

The larvae feed on Pinus ponderosa, Pinus arizonica and Pinus durangensis. They feed in the cones of their host plant. The larvae are about 30 mm long and brown with dark-gray subdorsal bands and a reddish-brown head.

References

Moths described in 1959
rossi